Kirkcudbright Academy is a state funded, six-year secondary school in Kirkcudbright, Scotland with about 400 pupils and 87 staff including teaching, support and administration.

Notable alumni

Jennie Adamson was a Labour Party politician in the United Kingdom. She sat in the House of Commons from 1938 to 1946, and served as a junior minister in Clement Attlee's post-war Labour government.
Samual Anderson first settler in Westernport, Victoria
John Brown of Wamphray, an exiled minister of the Church of Scotland, was the most important Scottish theologian of the period known as the Killing Time (1660–1688). He was one of the strongest defenders of the Covenanter cause. Among many books he wrote while residing in Holland, Brown's magnum opus is his De Causa Dei contra Antisabbatarios (2 volumes 4to, Rotterdam, 1674, 1676). Brown's life is detailed in Thomas Lockerby's book "A Sketch of the Life of the Rev. John Brown, Sometime Minister ... in Wamphray: With Notes and a Historical Appendix"
Katrina Bryan, actress
Malcolm Caldwell, (1931-1978)  academic and Marxist writer, twice chair of the Campaign for Nuclear Disarmament. Caldwell was murdered, under mysterious circumstances, a few hours after meeting Pol Pot in Cambodia. Was Dux of the academy in 1949.  
Finlay Carson, Scottish Conservative Party MSP for the Galloway and West Dumfries constituency
Robert Carson, leading expert on Roman coins, and Keeper of Coins and Medals at the British Museum from 1978 to 1983
John Corrie, Scottish Conservative and Unionist Party politician, former MP & MEP
David Coulthard, former Formula One racing driver
James Craik was Physician General (precursor of the Surgeon General) of the United States Army, and George Washington's personal physician and close friend.
John Duncan, Adventurer, explorer and author
John Erskine, 1st Baron Erskine of Rerrick, banker, Governor of Northern Ireland
Dr Maxwell Garthshore, Scottish physician who practiced as an Accoucheur and was a Fellow of the Royal Society
Bazil Gordon, tobacco merchant who by the time of his death was believed to be America's richest man and its first ever millionaire
Thomas Gordon, Scottish writer and Commonwealth man
Sir Robin Gray, former MP and 23rd Speaker of the New Zealand House of Representatives
William Greggan, Olympian who won a silver medal as a member of the Liverpool Police team in the Tug of war at the 1908 Summer Olympics
George Henry, Glasgow Boys Artist
Edward Atkinson Hornel, painter
Innes Ireland, former Formula One racing driver. Winner of the 1961 United States Grand Prix
David S. Kennedy, former New York Merchant Banker - in the early 1800s his bank Kennedy & Maitland was known as one of the "greatest commercial houses in the United States". Served in several roles including as the 23rd President in the charitable Saint Andrew's Society of the State of New York.
George Kerr politician
Robert Lenox, brother of David above, American businessman and property investor after whom the Lenox Hill neighborhood of Manhattan in New York City is named. As well as being one of the preeminent merchants of his day, Lenox held numerous civil positions including two periods as an Alderman of New York; being one of the founders of the Lying-in Hospital, along with Alexander Hamilton, and later its president; President of New York Chamber of Commerce and a trustee of Princeton College. On his death, Lenox's fortune passed to his only surviving son James Lenox, a noted bibliophile and philanthropist, who used the fortune to create the Lenox Library (now part of the New York Public Library) and to found the Presbyterian Hospital. Both the Lying-in Hospital and the Presbyterian Hospital are now, following a series of mergers, incorporated within the NewYork–Presbyterian Hospital.
Bert MacLachlan, former professional football player who played for Aston Villa F.C., Aberdeen F.C. and Heart of Midlothian F.C.
David MacMyn,  former rugby union international, captain of the British and Irish Lions on the 1927 British Lions tour to Argentina later a Selector for then as President of the Scottish Rugby Union.  He trained as a surgeon but, after military service in World War II, he returned to Kirkcudbright to join his father in General Practice.
Bob McDougall, former professional football player who played for Liverpool FC
Stafford McDowall, Professional rugby player with Glasgow Warriors
Sir John McMichael FRSE LLD, Cardiologist. He developed the Royal Postgraduate Medical School at Hammersmith.
James McMonies, former Canadian businessman and politician
Alexander Manson FRSE physician based in Nottingham who pioneered the use of iodine in medicine
Robert Milligan, Liberal Party politician and the first mayor of Bradford
William Mouncey Artist
Sir John Nairne, 1st Baronet, former Chief Cashier then Director of the Bank of England and a BBC Governor
Emma Pollock, Singer-songwriter, musician, and a founding member of the bands The Delgados, The Burns Unit and The Fruit Tree Foundation
Arthur Smith former rugby union player winning 33 caps for Scotland including some as captain, twice selected to tour with the British and Irish Lions, as a player on the 1955 British Lions tour to South Africa and as captain on the 1962 British Lions tour to South Africa. 
Samuel Smith, Liberal politician, former MP and co-founder of Edge Hill University
Edward Telfair,  American Revolutionary, slave owner, three time Governor of the state of Georgia, member of the Continental Congress, and signatory to the Articles of Confederation. Telfair County, Georgia is named after Edward Telfair and Telfair Square in Savannah, Georgia is named in honour of the Telfair family: Edward Telfair, his son Congressman Thomas Telfair and his daughter Mary Telfair, benefactor of Savannah's Telfair Museum of Art.
George Thompson, Former MP who initially attended as a pupil then returned as a French teacher in 1973-74 before being elected SNP MP for Galloway 1974–79. In 1989  he was ordained as a Roman Catholic priest and was appointed Parish Priest of St Peter's Catholic Church at Dalbeattie.
James Williamson Banker, pastoralist and politician in Australia. Member of the Legislative Council for Nelson Province from Dec 1882 to Aug 1888.
James Wolffe QC, is a senior Scottish lawyer who has served as Lord Advocate since 1 June 2016.

Notable staff
Christian Jane Fergusson, artist  taught for a year between 1905 and 1906 on secondment

References

External links
 

1582 establishments in Scotland
Educational institutions established in the 1580s
Secondary schools in Dumfries and Galloway
Kirkcudbright